The Best of BCL is a greatest hits album by Indonesian singer Bunga Citra Lestari. It released on 19 June 2013 by Aquarius Musikindo. In marketing this album, Bunga Citra Lestari and the record label working with KFC that this album will be circulated in all KFC stores in Indonesia.

Track listing

References 

2013 compilation albums